Mimusops sechellarum is a species of plant in the family Sapotaceae. It is endemic to Seychelles.

References

sechellarum
Trees of Seychelles
Vulnerable plants
Endemic flora of Seychelles
Taxonomy articles created by Polbot